Banquete Independent School District is a public school district based in the community of Banquete, Texas, United States.

It includes Banquete, Sandy Hollow-Escondidas, and half of Rancho Banquete.

Finances
As of the 2010–2011 school year, the appraised valuation of property in the district was $263,532,000. The maintenance tax rate was $0.104 and the bond tax rate was $0.043 per $100 of appraised valuation.

Academic achievement
In 2011, the school district was rated "recognized" by the Texas Education Agency.

Schools
In the 2011–2012 school year, the district had four schools.

Regular instruction
Banquete High School (grades 9-12)
Banquete Middle School (grades 6-8)
Banquete Elementary School (prekindergarten - grade 5)

Alternative instruction
Banquete JJAEP

See also

List of school districts in Texas

References

External links
 

School districts in Nueces County, Texas